McCowan's Ltd was a Scottish confectionery company specialising in toffee and fudge. Their most famous product is Highland Toffee.

History 
McCowan's originally began life as an aerated water business run by Andrew McCowan, His wife attempted to make some extra money on the side by selling toffee from the window of their house in Stenhousemuir (however the secret recipe was bought by McCowan in a pub from a man selling the toffee for a pint). The Toffee proved more successful than the Lemonade and soon became the primary family income.

Within 15 years, McCowan was producing a variety of confections including Tablet and later Rock, Snowballs, Lollypops and Macaroon were added to the company's products. But it was in the 1920s that McCowan began to produce the small toffee chews that would become the company's flagship confection - McCowan's Highland Toffee had arrived.

In the early years, Andrew worked from a shop in Church Street but in 1924 he opened a factory in its current location of Tryst Road. In 1951 Andrew died, and the company passed into the hands of his son Robert McCowan.
In 1959 Robert accepted an offer from the Nestlé company, yet still operated under its own brand

During the 1980s the company introduced the Wham Bar. Further development and an agreement with A.G. Barr also led to production of the Irn-Bru Bar.

In 1987 Nestlé merged with Rowntree's leading to a short term re-branding of McCowan's under the Nestlé-Rowntree name. In 1989 a Management Buyout occurred and the company once again became independent. In 1996 Dutch confectioner Phideas purchased the company, before the company became independent once more in 2003.

In 2005 the company was purchased by Graham Wallace and Andy Allan who later that year bought John Millar & Sons as a result McCowans ceased to exist as an independent company and merged with John Millar & Sons to become Millar McCowan
After this time the McCowans brand (separate from the McCowans company) transferred to firstly to The New McCowans Ltd then in October 2011 to Tangerine Confectionery.

Site is now demobilised and now lies a B&M with car park attached to a Tim Hortons. Stenhousemuir Stadium Ochilview is still in the street behind.

References

External links 
 
 https://web.archive.org/web/20090223111608/http://www.millar-mccowan.com/

Scottish confectionery
Scottish brands
Food manufacturers of Scotland
Brand name confectionery
Companies based in Falkirk (council area)
Stenhousemuir